Malay Indonesians (Malay/Indonesian: Orang Melayu Indonesia; Jawi: اورڠ ملايو ايندونيسيا) are ethnic Malays living throughout Indonesia. They are one of the indigenous peoples of the country. Indonesian, the national language of Indonesia, is a standardized form of Riau Malay. There were numerous kingdoms associated with the Indonesian Malays along with other ethnicities in what is now Indonesia, mainly on the islands of Borneo and Sumatra. These included Srivijaya, the Melayu Kingdom, Dharmasraya, the Sultanate of Deli, the Sultanate of Siak Sri Indrapura, the Riau-Lingga Sultanate, the Sultanate of Bulungan, Pontianak Sultanate, and the Sultanate of Sambas. The 2010 census states that there are 8 million Malays in Indonesia, this number comes from the classification of Malays in East Sumatra and the coast of Kalimantan which is recognized by the Indonesian government. This classification is different from the Malaysia and Singapore census which includes all ethnic Muslims from the Indonesian archipelago (inc. Acehnese, Banjarese, Bugis, Mandailing, Minangkabau and Javanese) as Malays.

Definition of Malay Ethnicity in Indonesia

Historically, Indonesia was home to a number of Malay sultanates that were involved in the process of Malayisation throughout the archipelago. Three main elements of Malayisation; Malay monarchy or fealty to Malay ruling sultan, the preeminence of Malay identity (which include superiority of ethnic Malay and Malay language), and supremacy of Islam as the official religion, has no official recognition in modern Indonesian statehood. This is mostly because the pluralism and diversity policy enshrined in the Pancasila national ideology avoids domination of certain group over another.

The 'Malay concept' adopted in Brunei, Malaysia, and Singapore does not have a special position in Indonesian state ideology, except as one of the constituent regional cultures — which tend to be represented on a province-by-province basis. Loyalty for a certain ethnic group was overshadowed with the new inter-ethnic loyalty, advocating the importance of the national unity and national identity of Bangsa Indonesia ("Indonesian nation") instead. Despite having widespread influence in the archipelago, ethnic Malay is only recognised as one of myriad Indonesian ethnic groups, which enjoy equal status with other Indonesians such as Javanese, Sundanese, Batak, Minangkabau, Acehnese, Banjarese, Dayak, Ambonese and Papuan.

Despite being the source of the Indonesian national language, Malay itself has been degraded as a mere local dialect in Sumatra, equal in status with Minangkabau, Acehnese and Batak languages. Compared to local Malay dialects in Sumatra, Indonesian developed further which absorbed terminology and vocabulary from other native Indonesian languages, as well as variations of local dialects across Indonesia.

History

Sumatra
There are various kingdoms and sultanates related to the history of the Malay people and other ethnicities on the island of Sumatra, such as Melayu Kingdom, Srivijaya, Dharmasraya, Sultanate of Deli, Sultanate of Siak Sri Indrapura, Asahan Sultanate, Riau-Lingga Sultanate, Riau Sultanate, Palembang Sultanate and the Lingga Sultanate, etc.

Kalimantan
There are various kingdoms and sultanates related to the history of the Malay people and other ethnicities on the island of Kalimantan (a.k.a. Borneo), such as Sanggau Kingdom, Pontianak Sultanate, Bulungan Sultanate, Berau Sultanate, Gunung Tabur Sultanate, Sambaliung Sultanate, Paser Sultanate, Kutai Sultanate, etc.

In the Pontianak incidents during the Japanese occupation of the Dutch East Indies, the Japanese massacred most of the Malay elite and beheaded all of the Malay Sultans in Kalimantan.

During the Fall of Suharto, there was a resurgence in Malay nationalism and identity in Kalimantan and ethnic Malays and Dayaks in Sambas massacred Madurese during the Sambas riots.

Language

Sumatra is the homeland of the Malay languages, which today spans all corners of Southeast Asia. The Indonesian language, which is the country's official language and lingua franca, was based on Riau Malay. The Malay language has a long history, which has a literary record as far back as the 7th century AD. A famous early Malay inscription, the Kedukan Bukit Inscription, was discovered by the Dutchman M. Batenburg on 29 November 1920, at Kedukan Bukit, South Sumatra, on the banks of the Tatang river, a tributary of the Musi River. It is a small stone of 45 by 80 cm. It is written in Old Malay, a possible ancestor of today's Malay language and its variants. Most Malay languages and dialects spoken in Indonesia are mutually unintelligible with Standard Indonesian. The most widely spoken are Palembang Malay (3.2 million), Jambi Malay (1 million), Bengkulu Malay (1.6 million) and Banjarese (4 million) (although not considered to be a dialect of Malay by its speakers; its minor dialect is typically called Bukit Malay). Besides the proper Malay languages, there are several languages closely related to Malay such as Minangkabau, Kerinci, Kubu and others. These languages are closely related to Malay, but their speakers do not consider their languages to be Malay. There are many Malay-based creoles spoken in the country especially in eastern Indonesia due to contacts from the western part of Indonesia and during colonial rule where Malay replaced Dutch as a lingua franca. The most well-known Malay creoles in Indonesia are Ambonese Malay, Betawi, Manado Malay and Papuan Malay.

Sub-ethnic groups of Indonesian Malays

Malay ethnic groups in Indonesia

The Malay people in Indonesia fall into various sub-ethnicities with each having its own distinct linguistic variety, history, clothing, traditions, and a sense of common identity. According to 2000 census, Malay Indonesians include:

Sumatra 
 Tamiang Malays
 Langkat Malays
 Deli Malays
 Asahan Malays
 Riau Malays
 Jambi Malays
 Palembang people
 Semendo people
 Bengkulu Malays
 Bangka Malays
 Belitung Malays

Kalimantan 
 Sambas Malays
 Pontianak Malays
 Ketapang Malays
 Kotawaringin Malays
 Berau Malays

Aboriginal Malays 
 Akit people
 Orang Rimba people
 Batin people
 Bonai people
 Orang Laut
 Petalangan
 Talang Mamak
 Sekak Bangka

Notable Malay Indonesians

Literature
 Andrea Hirata, Indonesian author
 Raja Ali Haji, a 19th-century historian, member of the royal house of Riau-Lingga and Selangor and National Hero of Indonesia

Royalty

 Tuanku Sultan Otteman II – a former Sultan of Deli, in which the kingdom's capital was Medan, in North Sumatra.
 Sultan Ma'mun Al Rashid Perkasa Alamyah – 9th Sultan of Deli Sultanate
 Sultan Hamid II – former Sultan of the Pontianak Sultanate
 Pangeran Ratu Winata Kusuma of Sambas – heir to the Sultanate of Sambas
 Sultan Syarif Kasim II – 12th Sultan of Siak Sultanate

Politics
 Marzuki Alie – speaker of the People's Representative Council, 2009–2014 term
 Hatta Rajasa – the Coordinating Minister for Economic Affairs in the Second United Indonesia Cabinet. Previously, he was the State Secretary, Minister of Transport and Minister for Research and Technology in the Mutual Assistance Cabinet (2001–2004).
 Amir Hamzah – an Indonesian poet and National Hero of Indonesia.
 Hamzah Haz – an Indonesian politician. He is the head of the United Development Party (PPP) and served as the ninth Vice-President from 2001 until 2004.
 Yusril Ihza Mahendra – former chairman of the Crescent Star Party
 Alex Noerdin – the 15th Governor of South Sumatra
 Muhammad Lukman Edy – the former Minister for Acceleration of Disadvantaged Regions in 2007/2009
 Muhammad Sani – the 2nd Governor of Riau Island
 Rizal Nurdin – the 15th Governor of North Sumatra
 Rusli Zainal – the 13th Governor of Riau
 Tantowi Yahya – Indonesian TV presenter turned politician.

Entertainment
 Ariel Peterpan – the lead singer vocalist of Indonesian band Noah
 Carissa Putri – Indonesian model and actress
 Revalina Sayuthi Temat – Indonesian actress, popularly known for her work in Bawang Merah Bawang Putih
 Titi Kamal – prominent Indonesian actress and singer
 Farah Quinn – celebrity chef

See also

 Proto-Malay

References

Notes

Citations

Bibliography

External links
Malay dialects of Indonesia 
Jambi Explorer
MelayuOnline

Ethnic groups in Indonesia
 
Malay people
Muslim communities of Indonesia